Michael Palmer (born May 11, 1943) is an American poet and translator. He attended Harvard University, where he earned a BA in French and an MA in Comparative Literature. He has worked extensively with Contemporary dance for over thirty years and has collaborated with many composers and visual artists. Palmer has lived in San Francisco since 1969.

Palmer is the 2006 recipient of the Wallace Stevens Award from the Academy of American Poets. This $100,000 (US) prize recognizes outstanding and proven mastery in the art of poetry.

Beginnings
Michael Palmer began actively publishing poetry in the 1960s. Two events in the early sixties would prove particularly decisive for his development as a poet.

First, he attended the now famous Vancouver Poetry Conference in 1963. This July–August 1963 Poetry Conference in Vancouver, British Columbia spanned three weeks and involved about sixty people who had registered for a program of discussions, workshops, lectures, and readings designed by Warren Tallman and Robert Creeley as a summer course at the University of B.C. There Palmer met writers and artists who would leave an indelible mark on his own developing sense of a poetics, especially Robert Duncan, Robert Creeley, and Clark Coolidge, with whom he formed lifelong friendships. It was a landmark moment as Robert Creeley observed:
Vancouver Poetry Conference brought together for the first time, a decisive company of then disregarded poets such as Denise Levertov, Charles Olson, Allen Ginsberg, Robert Duncan, Margaret Avison, Philip Whalen... together with as yet unrecognised younger poets of that time, Michael Palmer, Clark Coolidge and many more."

Palmer's second initiation into the rites of a public poet began with the editing of the journal Joglars with fellow poet Clark Coolidge. Joglars (Providence, Rhode Island) numbered just three issues in all, published between 1964–66, but extended the correspondence with fellow poets begun in Vancouver. The first issue appeared in Spring 1964 and included poems by Gary Snyder, Michael McClure, Fielding Dawson, Jonathan Williams, Lorine Niedecker, Robert Kelly, and Louis Zukofsky. Palmer published five of his own poems in the second number of Joglars, an issue that included work by Larry Eigner, Stan Brakhage, Russell Edson, and Jackson Mac Low.

For those who attended the Vancouver Conference or learned about it later on, it was apparent that the poetics of Charles Olson, proprioceptive or Projectivist in its reach, was exerting a significant and lasting influence on the emerging generation of artists and poets who came to prominence in the 1950s and 1960s. Subsequent to this emerging generation of artists who felt Olson's impact, poets such as Robert Creeley and Robert Duncan would in turn exert their own huge impact on our national poetries (see also: Black Mountain poets and San Francisco Renaissance). Of this particular company of poets encountered in Vancouver, Palmer says:

Early development of poetry and poetics

Following the Vancouver Conference, Robert Duncan and Robert Creeley remained primary resources. Both poets had a lasting, active influence on Palmer's work which has extended until the present. In an essay, "Robert Duncan and Romantic Synthesis" (see 'External links' below), Palmer recognizes that Duncan's appropriation and synthesis of previous poetic influences was transformed into a poetics noted for "exploratory audacity...the manipulation of complex, resistant harmonies, and by the kinetic idea of "composition by field", whereby all elements of the poem are potentially equally active in the composition as 'events' of the poem".

And if this statement marks a certain tendency readers have noted in Palmer's work all along, or remains a touchstone of sorts, we sense that from the beginning Palmer has consistently confronted not only the problem of subjectivity and public address in poetry, but the specific agency of Poetry and the relationship between poetry and the political: "The implicit...question has always concerned the human and social justification for this strange thing, poetry, when it is not directly driven by the political or by some other, equally other evident purpose [...] Whereas the significant artistic thrust has always been toward artistic independence within the world, not from it."

So for Michael Palmer, this tendency seems there from the beginning. Today these concerns continue through multiple collaborations across the fields of poetry, dance, translation, and the visual arts. Perhaps similar to Olson's impact on his generation, Palmer's influence remains singular and palpable, if difficult to measure. Since Olson's death in 1970, we continue to be, following upon George Oppen's phrase, carried into the incalculable, As Palmer recently noted in a blurb for Claudia Rankine's poetic testament Don't Let Me Be Lonely (2004), ours is "a time when even death and the self have been re-configured as commodities".

Work
Palmer is the author of twelve full-length books of poetry, including Thread (2011), Company of Moths (2005) (shortlisted for the 2006 Canadian Griffin Poetry Prize), Codes Appearing: Poems 1979-1988 (2001), The Promises of Glass (2000), The Lion Bridge: Selected Poems 1972-1995 (1998), At Passages (1996), Sun (1988), First Figure (1984), Notes for Echo Lake (1981), Without Music (1977), The Circular Gates (1974), and Blake's Newton (1972). A prose work, The Danish Notebook, was published in 1999. In the spring of 2007, a chapbook, The Counter-Sky (with translations by Koichiro Yamauchi), was published by Meltemia Press of Japan, to coincide with the Tokyo Poetry and Dance Festival. His work has appeared in literary magazines such as Boundary 2, Berkeley Poetry Review, Sulfur, Conjunctions, Grand Street and O-blek.

Besides the 2006 Wallace Stevens Award, Michael Palmer's honors include two grants from the Literature Program of the National Endowment for the Arts. In 1989-90 he was a Guggenheim Fellow. During the years 1992–1994 he held a Lila Wallace-Reader's Digest Fund Writer's Award. From 1999 to 2004, he served as a Chancellor of the Academy of American Poets. In the spring of 2001 he received the Shelly Memorial Prize Prize from the Poetry Society of America.

Introducing Palmer for a reading at the DIA Arts Center in 1996, Brighde Mullins noted that Palmer's poetics is both "situated yet active". Palmer alludes to this himself, perhaps, when he speaks of poetry signaling a "site of passages". He says, "The space of the page is taken as a site in itself, a syntactical and visual space to be expressively exploited, as was the case with the Black Mountain poets, as well as writers such as Frank O'Hara, perhaps partly in response to gestural abstract painting."

Elsewhere he observes that "in our reading we have to rediscover the radical nature of the poem." In turn, this becomes a search for "the essential place of lyric poetry" as it delves "beneath it to its relationship with language". Since he seems to explore the nature of language and its relation to human consciousness and perception, Palmer is often associated with the Language poets (sometimes referred to as the L=A=N=G=U=A=G=E poets, after the magazine that bears that name).

Of this particular association, Palmer comments in a recent (2000) interview:

Critical reception
Michael Palmer's poetry has been described variously as abstract, intimate, allusive, personal, political and inaccessible.

While some reviewers or readers may value Palmer's work as an "extension of modernism", they criticize and even reject Palmer's work as discordant: an interruption of our composure (to invoke Robert Duncan's phrase). Palmer's own stated poetics will not allow or settle for "vanguard gesturalism". In a singular confrontion with the modernist project, the poet must suffer 'loss', embrace disturbance and paradox, and agonize over what cannot be accounted for. It is a poetry that can, at once, gesture toward post-modern, post-avant-garde, semiotic concerns even as it acknowledges that

We can recognize that the "weary beauty" of Palmer's work bespeaks the tension and accord he offers toward the Modernists and the vanguardists, even as he is seeking to maintain or at least continue to search for an ethics of the I/Thou.

It is an awkward truce we make with modernism when there is no cessation of hostilities. But sometimes in reading Palmer's work we recognize (almost against ourselves) a poetry that is described as surreal in context and contour, livid in aural accomplishment, but all the while confronts the reader with a poetics both active and situated. And if Palmer is sometimes praised for this, more often than not he is criticized, rebuked, vilified and dismissed (just as Paul Celan was) for hermeticism, deliberate obscurity, and bogus erudition. Palmer admits to a stated "essential errancy of discovery in the poem" that would not necessarily be a "unified narrative explanation of the self", but would allow for itself "cloaked meaning and necessary semantic indirection"

Confrontation with Modernism

He remains candid about the giants of modernism: i.e., Yeats, Eliot and Pound. Whether it is the fascism of Ezra Pound or the less overt but no less insidious anti-semitism found in the work of T. S. Eliot, Palmer's position is a fierce rejection of their politics, but qualified with the acknowledgment that, as Marjorie Perloff has observed of Pound, "he remains the great inventor of the period, the poet who really MADE THINGS NEW". Thus, Palmer decries that what remains for us is something quite harrowing "inscribed at the heart of modernism".

Perhaps we can invoke one of Palmer's real 'heroes', Antonio Gramsci, and say here, now, what precisely has been inscribed over against what today (in the vicious circles of media and cultural production) is merely forecast as cultural hegemony.

So if Palmer, on the one hand, variously describes or defines an Ideology as that which "invades the field of meaning", we recognize not only in Pound or Eliot, but now as if against ourselves, that ideology implicitly deploys values and premises that must remain unspoken in order for them to function as ideology or to remain hidden in plain sight, as such. At some point we can invoke the 'post-ideological' stance of Slavoj Žižek who, after Althusser, jettisons the Marxist equation: ideology=false consciousness and say that, perhaps Ideology, to all intents and purposes, IS consciousness.

As a way out of this seeming double-bind, or to his admissions that poetry is, as Pound observed, "news that stays news", that it remains an active and viable (or "actively situated") principle within the social dynamic, critics and readers alike point to Palmer's own avowals of an emerging countertradition to the prevailing literary establishment: an 'alternative tradition' that just slipped under the radar as far as the Academy and its various 'schools' of poetry are concerned. Though not always so visible, this counter-tradition continues to exert an underground influence. Poetry, as critique or praise, can perhaps in its reach exceed the grasp of modernism and procure for us as visible again, that which is all or nothing except for the 'ghostlier demarcations' of the social wager within sight of the shipwreck of the singular (as George Oppen characterized it) which denotes or delimits the very idea of the social, if not the very idea that there is a definition of the social other than this : the community of those who have no community. Indeed, the unavowable community (to borrow a title and phrasing from Maurice Blanchot).

Faced with shipwreck, "in the dark" amidst the ravished heresies of the unspoken as even against silence itself, we can think with the poem. With fierce determination or graceful adherence we can perhaps even "see" with the poem, account for its usefulness. Even as we use the language, attend to its fissures and abhorrences, language in turn uses us, or has its own uses for us, as Palmer attests:

Palmer has repeatedly stated, in interviews and in various talks given across the years, that the situation for the poet is paradoxical: a seeing which is blind, a "nothing you can see", an "active waiting", "purposive, sometimes a music", or a "nowhere" that is "now / here". For Palmer, it is a situation which is never over, and yet it mysteriously starts up again each day, as if describing a circle. Poetry can "interrogate the radical and violent instability of our moment, asking where is the location of culture,
where the site of self, selves, among others" (as Palmer has characterized the poetry of Myung Mi Kim).

Collaborations
Palmer has published translations from French, Russian and Brazilian Portuguese, and has engaged in multiple collaborations with painters. These include the German painter Gerhard Richter, French painter Micaëla Henich, and Italian painter Sandro Chia. He edited and helped translate Nothing The Sun Could Not Explain: Twenty Contemporary Brazilian Poets (Sun & Moon Press, 1997). With Michael Molnar and John High, Palmer helped edit and translate a volume of poetry by the Russian poet Alexei Parshchikov, Blue Vitriol (Avec Books, 1994). He also translated "Theory of Tables" (1994), a book written by Emmanuel Hocquard, a project that grew out of Hocquard's translations of Palmer's "Baudelaire Series" into French. Palmer has written many radio plays and works of criticism. But his lasting significance occurs as the singular concerns of the artist extend into the aleatory, the multiple, and the collaborative.

Dance
For more than thirty years he has collaborated on over a dozen dance works with Margaret Jenkins and her Dance Company. Early dance scenarios in which Palmer participated include Interferences, 1975; Equal Time, 1976; No One but Whitington, 1978; Red, Yellow, Blue, 1980, Straight Words, 1980; Versions by Turns, 1980; Cortland Set, 1982; and First Figure, 1984. A particularly noteworthy example of a recent Jenkins/Palmer collaboration would be The Gates (Far Away Near), an evening-length dance work in which Palmer worked with not only Ms. Jenkins, but also Paul Dresher and Rinde Eckert. This was performed in September 1993 in the San Francisco Bay Area and in July 1994 at New York's Lincoln Center. Another recent collaboration with Jenkins resulted in "Danger Orange", a 45-minute outdoor site-specific performance, presented in October 2004 before the Presidential elections. The color orange metaphorically references the national alert systems that are in place that evoke the sense of danger.[see also:Homeland Security Advisory System]

Painters and visual artists
Similar to his friendship with Robert Duncan and the painter Jess Collins, Palmer's work with painter Irving Petlin remains generative. Irving's singular influence from the beginning demonstrated for Palmer a "working" of the poet as "maker" (in the radical sense, even ancient sense of that word). Along with Duncan, Zukofsky, and others, Petlin's work modeled, demonstrated, circumscribed and, perhaps most importantly for Palmer, verified that "the way" (this way for the artist who is a maker, a creator) would also be, as Gilles Deleuze termed it, "a life". This in turn delineates Palmer's own sense of both a poetics and an ongoing counter-poetic tradition, offering him fixture and a place of repair.

Recently he worked with painter and visual artist Augusta Talbot, and curated her exhibition at the CUE Art Foundation (March 17 -April 23, 2005). When asked in an interview how collaboration has pushed the boundaries of his work, Palmer responded :

It may be that for Palmer, friendship (acknowledging both the multiple and collaborative), becomes in part what Jack Spicer terms a "composition of the real". Across the fields of painting and dance, Palmer's work figures as an "unrelenting tentacle of the proprioceptive". Furthermore, it may signal a Coming Community underscored in the work of Giorgio Agamben, Jean-Luc Nancy and Maurice Blanchot among others. It is a poetry that would, along with theirs, articulate a place for, even spaces where, both the "poetic imaginary" is constituted and a possible social space is envisioned. As Jean-Luc Nancy has written in The Inoperative Community (1991): "These places, spread out everywhere, yield up and orient new spaces...other tracks, other ways, other places for all who are there."

Bibliography

Poetry
 Plan of the City of O, Barn Dreams Press (Boston, Massachusetts), 1971.
 Blake's Newton, Black Sparrow Press (Santa Barbara, California), 1972.
 C's Songs, Sand Dollar Books (Berkeley, California), 1973.
 Six Poems, Black Sparrow Press (Santa Barbara, California), 1973.
 The Circular Gates, Black Sparrow Press (Santa Barbara, California), 1974.
 (Translator, with Geoffrey Young) Vicente Huidobro, Relativity of Spring: 13 Poems, Sand Dollar Books (Berkeley, California), 1976.
 Without Music, Black Sparrow Press (Santa Barbara, California), 1977.
 Alogon, Tuumba Press (Berkeley, California), 1980.
 Notes for Echo Lake, North Point Press (Berkeley, California), 1981.
 (Translator) Alain Tanner and John Berger, Jonah Who Will Be 25 in the Year 2000, North Atlantic Books (Berkeley, California), 1983.
 First Figure, North Point Press (Berkeley, California), 1984.
 Sun, North Point Press (Berkeley, California), 1988.
 At Passages, New Directions (New York, New York), 1995.
 The Lion Bridge: Selected Poems, 1972-1995, New Directions (New York, New York), 1998.
 The Promises of Glass, New Directions (New York, New York), 2000.
 Codes Appearing: Poems, 1979-1988, New Directions (New York, New York), 2001. Notes for Echo Lake, First Figure, and Sun together in one volume. 
 (With Régis Bonvicino) Cadenciando-um-ning, um samba, para o outro: poemas, traduções, diálogos, Atelieì Editorial (Cotia, Brazil), 2001.
 Company of Moths, New Directions (New York, New York), 2005. 
 Aygi Cycle , Druksel (Ghent, Belgium), 2009 (chapbook with 10 new poems, inspired by the Russian poet Gennadiy Aygi.
 (With Jan Lauwereyns) Truths of Stone, Druksel (Ghent, Belgium), 2010.
 Thread, New Directions (New York, New York), 2011. 
 The Laughter of the Sphinx, New Directions (New York, New York), 2016.

Other
 Idem 1-4 (radio plays), 1979.
 (Editor) Code of Signals: Recent Writings in Poetics, North Atlantic Books (Berkeley, California), 1983.
 The Danish Notebook, Avec Books (Penngrove, California), 1999 — prose/memoir
 Active Boundaries: Selected Essays and Talks, New Directions (New York, New York), 2008.

Palmer sites and exhibits
 Exhibit at The Academy of American Poets includes links to on-line poems by Palmer not listed below
 Modern American Poetry site
 Author Page at Internationales Literatufestival Berlin site (in English) Palmer was a guest of the ILB (Internationales Literatufestival Berlin/ Germany) in 2001 and 2005.
 An internet bibliography for Michael Palmer from LiteraryHistory.com

Poems
 "Dream of a Language That Speaks" a poem from Company of Moths (2005) @ Jacket Magazine site
 "Scale" first published in Richter 858 (ed. David Breskin, The Shifting Foundation, SF MOMA: San Francisco Museum of Modern Art); included in Company of Moths
 "Autobiography 3" & Autobiography 5" two poems from Conjunctions magazine's on-line archive; included in The Promises of Glass (2000)
 To the Title (Are there titles?) included in Jacket Magazine 33 four poems from Thread from Boston Review's March/April 2010 issue
 Video of Palmer at the 2010 Sydney (Australia) Writers Festival.
 Video of Palmer reading a poem from Mahmoud Darwish's collection Unfortunately, It Was Paradise: Selected Poems Michael Palmer, Paul Hoover with the poetry of Maria Baranda - September 27, 2015 – Palmer reads from his book Thread and from his forthcoming collection The Laughter of the Sphinx. He also reads a single poem from his collection The Company of Moths.

Selected essays and talks
 Period (senses of duration) this is a version of a talk Palmer gave in San Francisco in February 1982. Scroll down to "Table of Contents" to find the Palmer selection. Here it appears in an e-book representation of Code of Signals (which Palmer edited in 1983, with the subtitle "Recent Writings in Poetics").
 On Robert Duncan reprint of Palmer's essay "Robert Duncan and Romantic Synthesis" Michael Palmer audio-files at PENNsound
 "On the Sustaining of Culture in Dark Times" text of Palmer's keynote address given at the 3rd Annual Sustainable Living Conference at Evergreen State College in February 2004
 "Ground Work: On Robert Duncan" Michael Palmer's "Introduction" to a combined edition of Ground Work: Before the War, and Ground Work II: In the Dark, published by New Directions in April 2006.
 Lunch Poems reading by Michael Palmer: Webcast Held on October 5, 2006, in the Morrison Library, University of California at Berkeley: webcast online
 "In Company: On Artistic Collaboration and Solitude" This is the title of the lecture/talk that Palmer gave, along with a poetry reading, at the University of Chicago in October 2006. (In audio & video format)
 Bad to the bone: What I learned outside Lecture & Talk given in June 2002, when Palmer taught for a brief stint at the Jack Kerouac School of Disembodied Poetics at Naropa in Boulder, Colorado
 Poetic Obligations (Talking about Nothing at Temple) This is a talk Palmer gave at Temple University in February 1999, and was originally published in Fulcrum: An annual of poetry and aesthetics (Issue 2, 2003).
 Poetry and Contingency: Within a Timeless Moment of Barbaric Thought essay/talk originally published in the Chicago Review (June, 2003)

Interviews with Palmer
 The River City Interview conducted by Paul Naylor, Lindsay Hill, and J. P. Craig; appeared in 1994.
 An Interview with Michael Palmer by Robert Hicks in 2006
 Interview at Berkeley Daily Planet: April 7, 2006 discusses a reading Palmer & Douglas Blazek gave together at Moe's, a bookstore in Berkeley, California; includes interviews
  Interview with Michael Palmer an interview conducted at Washington University in St. Louis in 2008 by the student editors of "Arch Literary Journal" in conjunction with a talk and reading Palmer gave at the school. Includes an introductory essay by one of the editors, Lawrence Revard, "'What Reading?': Play in Michael Palmer's Poetics"

Others on Palmer
 Margaret Jenkins Dance Company info on both Palmer & his collaborators in their on-going work with Dance
 Lauri Ramey:"Michael Palmer: The Lion Bridge" Ramey wrote a doctoral dissertation on Palmer, and here reviews his "Selected Poems"
 A Collision of "Possible Worlds" A 2002 review of The Promises of Glass by Michael Dowdy @Free Verse website
 A review of Company of Moths a book review of Palmer's 2005 collection
 Griffin Poetry Prize biography, including audio and video clips Palmer was shortlisted for this prize in 2006
 Margaret Jenkins Dance Company's "A Slipping Glimpse" 2006 dance piece in collaboration with Tanushree Shankar Dance School & the text by Palmer
 Cultural camaraderie article from Hindustantimes.com on the dance performance A Slipping Glimpse. Article discusses Palmer's collaboration (includes quotes)
 Palmer is Spring 2007 Writer in Residence press release from California College of the Arts
 Michael Palmer (Six Introductions) a brief essay by Clayton Eshleman who edited Sulfur'' magazine, for which Palmer served as a contributing editor.
Hands Across Many Seas: From San Francisco and India, a dance collaboration article by Deborah Jowitt on "A Slipping Glimpse", performed by the Margaret Jenkins Dance Company at the "Danspace Project" at Saint Mark's Church, October 4 through 6, 2007
Lyric Persuasions at Poets House Rae Armantrout and Zoketsu Norman Fischer discuss Michael Palmer's work as recorded by Vasiliki Katsarou at the Poet's House in the Spring of 2010

Notes

External links

References

1943 births
Living people
American male poets
Language poets
English-language poets
American translators
Harvard University alumni
Writers from New York City
Writers from San Francisco